Golden Pheasant may refer to:
 Golden pheasant
 Golden Pheasant (beer)
 Golden Pheasant (horse), racehorse
 Golden Pheasant Award, the highest award given by the Scout Association of Japan
 Operation Golden Pheasant, 1988 U.S. military operation in Honduras against the Sandinistas